Figgins is a surname. Notable people and characters with the surname include:

Vincent Figgins (1766–1844), English typeface designer
James Figgins (1811–1884), his son, typefounder and member of Parliament
Jim Figgins (1893–1956), Scottish trade unionist
Chone Figgins (born 1978), American baseball player
Morgan Figgins (born 1992), American figure skater
Principal Figgins, character in the American television programme Glee